Marcelin may refer to:

Places
Marcelin, part of the Grunwald district of Poznań
Marcelin, Łódź Voivodeship (central Poland)
Marcelin, Masovian Voivodeship (east-central Poland)
Marcelin, Saskatchewan, Canada
Marcelin, West Pomeranian Voivodeship (north-west Poland)
Marcelin, Saint-Louis-du-Sud, Haiti, a village in the Aquin arrondissement of Haiti.

Other
James Marcelin (born 1986), Haitian footballer
Jasmine R. Marcelin, Caribbean-American physician